The 2000 Mid-Continent Conference men's basketball tournament was held March 5–7, 2000, at Allen County War Memorial Coliseum in Fort Wayne, Indiana.
This was the 17th edition of the tournament for the Association of Mid-Continent Universities/Mid-Continent Conference, now known as the Summit League.

Second seed Valparaiso defeated top seed  71–62 to earn an automatic berth into the 2000 NCAA tournament.

Bracket

References 

Summit League men's basketball tournament
1999–2000 Mid-Continent Conference men's basketball season
2000 in sports in Indiana